The Black Hills Brawl is an annual football game between Black Hills State University and South Dakota School of Mines and Technology. Also known as The Battle for the Homestake Trophy or rarely called the West River Rivalry, the winner of the game receives the Homestake Trophy. The current venues the game is played in are Lyle Hare Stadium since 1960 (Black Hills State) and O'Harra Stadium since 1938 (South Dakota Mines). First played in 1895 and played 135 times, the Black Hills Brawl is the most played in NCAA Division II and tied for the oldest rivalry in DII (alongside the Battle of the Ravine); it is the 4th most played rivalry nationwide in any division (behind only Harvard–Yale football rivalry, Princeton–Yale, and The Rivalry (Lafayette–Lehigh)).

First game
The first meeting in November 28, 1895 was between SDSM&T (then known as the Dakota School of Mines) and a now-defunct and unrelated Methodist college in Hot Springs known as Black Hills College, after BHSU (then known as Spearfish Normal) turned Black Hills College down. Despite this, both current schools generally include this game in the rivalry's chronology, but do not count it against their records; the first official meeting did not come until 1900.

Game results

Note: SDSM&T was known at the Dakota School of Mines until 1889, when it became the South Dakota School of Mines; it became SDSM&T in 1943. BHSU was known as Spearfish Normal until 1941, when it became the Black Hills Teachers College; it would be renamed Black Hills State College in 1964 and BHSU in 1989.

Basketbrawl
Men's Basketball rivalry currently stands at 113-92, in favor of Black Hills State. Below are results where the score is known. The two have played each other since 1948.

See also 
 List of NCAA college football rivalry games

References

College football rivalries in the United States
South Dakota Mines Hardrockers football
Black Hills State Yellow Jackets football
College football rivalry trophies in the United States
1900 establishments in South Dakota
Recurring sporting events established in 1900